Rawatpura is a tiny village 10 km east of Kulpahar, in the state of Uttar Pradesh, India. It has many ruins of temples of the Chandela dynasty.

References 

Bundelkhand
Tourist attractions in Mahoba district
Villages in Mahoba district